Don Evenden (1931-2018) was an Australian rugby league footballer who played in the 1950s and 1960s. He played in the NSWRFL premiership for North Sydney and Balmain as a prop.

Playing career
Evenden began his first grade career with North Sydney in 1952 and was a member of the Norths sides which reached the preliminary finals in 1952 and 1953 but fell short of a grand final appearance.  In 1954, Evenden was selected to play for New South Wales and Australia but failed to make an appearance for the Australian side as he was an unused reserve in the third test against Great Britain.  In 1957, Evenden was selected to play for New South Wales again as they defeated Queensland 69–5 in an interstate series match.  In 1959, Evenden joined Balmain and spent two seasons with them making a total of 10 appearances.

References

1931 births
2018 deaths
Australian rugby league players
North Sydney Bears players
Balmain Tigers players
Rugby league props
Rugby league players from Sydney
New South Wales rugby league team players